Colorado River Bridge may refer to:

 Mike O'Callaghan – Pat Tillman Memorial Bridge, spanning the Colorado River just downstream of Hoover Dam
 Colorado River Bridge (De Beque, Colorado), listed on the National Register of Historic Places in Mesa County, Colorado
 Colorado River Bridge (Wharton, Texas), listed on the National Register of Historic Places in Wharton County, Texas